Jean Carlos Sales Bemvindo (born 17 March 1984), or simply Jean Carlos, is a Brazilian striker.

Club career

Levski Sofia
Jean Carlos arrived in Bulgaria on 5 December 2007. On 6 December 2007 Brazilian forward has signed a three-year contract with PFC Levski Sofia and became an official part of the team. The transfer fee was reportedly close to 1 million dollars. He participated in his first training with Levski on 7 December 2007. Jean made his unofficial debut in a friendly match against FC Dynamo Kyiv on 20 January 2008. He played for 63 minutes. Levski lost the match with a result of 1:2.

On 5 February 2008 Jean Carlos scored his first goal for Levski Sofia in 62nd minute against České Budějovice. Levski won the match with a 1:0 result. His next goal was just a match after against FC Rapid București. He scored in 37th minute. The match ended in a result 3:2 with a win for Levski.

He made his official debut for Levski on 24 February 2008 in a match against Chernomorets Burgas. On the same match he scored his first goal for Levski in A PFG. Levski won the match. The result was 2:1, after a second goal from Daniel Borimirov.

Jean made his debut in Europe on 13 August 2008 in a match against FC BATE Borisov. He entered the game as a substitute, but was unable to help the team secure a draw.

Carlos was sold to FC Amkar Perm on 6 February 2009.

Amkar Perm
On 6 February 2009 it was announced that Jean Carlos will move to Amkar Perm. Carlos made his debut on 14 February 2009 in a match against FC Shinnik Yaroslavl. The match was a draw and Jean played until the 70th minute. On 16 May 2009, Jean Carlos scored his first goal for the team from Perm in the 2:2 home draw with FC Rubin Kazan. On 14 February 2010, Jean Carlos was loaned to FC Shinnik Yaroslavl and the parameters on the deal aren't disclosed.

Playing style
A creative forward who often makes unpredictable moves. He prefers being near the goalkeeper, and making chances for his teammates as well to finish the attacks himself.

Honours 
Ituano
Campeonato Paulista: 2014

References

External links
Profile at LevskiSofia.info

Jean Carlos at ZeroZero

1984 births
Sportspeople from Salvador, Bahia
Living people
Brazilian footballers
Association football forwards
Esporte Clube Bahia players
Sociedade Esportiva e Recreativa Caxias do Sul players
Clube Atlético Tubarão players
Clube Atlético Sorocaba players
Atlético Clube Goianiense players
Associação Chapecoense de Futebol players
Figueirense FC players
PFC Levski Sofia players
FC Amkar Perm players
FC Shinnik Yaroslavl players
Ceará Sporting Club players
Joinville Esporte Clube players
Clube Atlético Hermann Aichinger players
Ituano FC players
Brusque Futebol Clube players
Camboriú Futebol Clube players
Sport Club São Paulo players
Veranópolis Esporte Clube Recreativo e Cultural players
Barra Futebol Clube players
Clube Atlético Juventus players
Clube Esportivo Bento Gonçalves players
Grêmio Esportivo Glória players
Campeonato Brasileiro Série A players
Campeonato Brasileiro Série B players
Campeonato Brasileiro Série C players
Campeonato Brasileiro Série D players
Campeonato Catarinense players
First Professional Football League (Bulgaria) players
Russian Premier League players
Russian First League players
Brazilian expatriate footballers
Expatriate footballers in Bulgaria
Brazilian expatriate sportspeople in Bulgaria
Expatriate footballers in Russia
Brazilian expatriate sportspeople in Russia